Adalat Mamedov (born 3 August 1974) is an Azerbaijani boxer. He competed in the men's super heavyweight event at the 1996 Summer Olympics.

References

External links
 

1974 births
Living people
Azerbaijani male boxers
Olympic boxers of Azerbaijan
Boxers at the 1996 Summer Olympics
Place of birth missing (living people)
Super-heavyweight boxers
20th-century Azerbaijani people